The Grand Prix de Caen was an auto racing event, held in la Prairie park in Caen.

Only six races were held between 1952 and 1958, the 1955 race being cancelled after that year's Le Mans disaster. The first race was run under Formula Two rules. In 1953 the event was run for sports cars, and all subsequent events were run under Formula One rules.

Winners

References

External links
Horsepower on the Prairie

 
Sports car races
Caen
Auto races in France
Sport in Caen